The Tarikh-i guzida (also spelled Tarikh-e Gozideh ("Excerpt history"), is a compendium of Islamic history from the creation of the world until 1329, written by Hamdallah Mustawfi and finished in 1330. It was written in a dry simple style and dedicated to Ghiyath al-Din Muhammad.

Content
The Tarikh-i guzida contains the history of the Islamic world, from the creation of the world up to 1329(729 AH). The introduction includes the creation of the world followed by six sections;
 The prophets
 Persian Kings before Muhammad
 Muhammad and caliphs
 Persia and other lands ruled by Muslim dynasties
 Poets and scholars
 Region and history of Kazwin(Qazvin)

Also mentioned is the Mongol invasion. Qazvini produced a world map in the Tarikh-i guzida which contained meridians. Qazvini declared the Afghans to be Israelites.

Modern era
The Tarikh-i guzida was very popular and numerous copies existed, of which many were found in European collections. It was partially translated into French in 1903 by Jules Gantin. E.G. Browne published a complete edition in 1910 and an abridged English version in 1913.  In 1960, Abd al-Husayn Nava'i published a complete version of the ''Tarikh-i guzida.

References

Sources 
 
  
 

 
 

History books about Islam
History books about Iran
Persian-language books
14th-century history books